Hildale is a city in Washington County, Utah, United States. The population was 1,127 at the 2020 census.

Hildale is located on the border of Utah and Arizona.

History
Hildale, formerly known as Short Creek Community, was founded in 1913 by members of the Council of Friends, a breakaway group from the Salt Lake City-based the Church of Jesus Christ of Latter-day Saints (LDS Church).

During a flash flood on 14 September 2015, at least 12 members of two related families from the community were killed while stopped in a low water crossing at the mouth of Maxwell Canyon in Hildale. A thirteenth person was still missing as of 16 March 2021. The flooding resulted from the moisture from Hurricane Linda.

Geography

Climate
According to the Köppen Climate Classification system, Hildale has a semi-arid climate, abbreviated "BSk" on climate maps.

Demographics

As of the census of 2000, there were 1,895 people, 232 households, and 215 families residing in the city. The population density was 644.2 per square mile (248.9/km2). There were 243 housing units at an average density of 82.6 per square mile (31.9/km2). The racial makeup of the city was 96.41% White, 0.21% African American, 0.47% Native American, 0.63% Asian, 0.63% Pacific Islander, 0.84% from other races, and 0.79% from two or more races. Hispanic or Latino of any race were 1.00% of the population.

There were 232 households, out of which 76.7% had children under 18 living with them, 82.3% were married couples living together, 8.6% had a female householder with no husband present, and 6.9% were non-families. 6.0% of all households were made up of individuals, and 4.3% had someone living alone who was 65 years of age or older. The average household size was 8.17, and the average family size was 8.10.

In the city, the population was spread out, with 63.6% under 18, 8.8% from 18 to 24, 18.4% from 25 to 44, 6.3% from 45 to 64, and 2.8% who were 65 years of age or older. The median age was 13 years. For every 100 females, there were 96.2 males. For every 100 females aged 18 and over, there were 75.8 males.

The median income for a household in the city was $32,679, and the median income for a family was $31,750. Males had a median income of $25,170 versus $16,071 for females. The per capita income for the city was $4,782. About 37.0% of families and 41.2% of the population were below the poverty line, including 42.0% of those under age 18 and 31.8% of those aged 65 or over.

Government

In January 2018, the city's first female mayor, Donia Jessop, was sworn in along with a new city council. This also marked the first time positions in city government have been held by people who are not members of the Fundamentalist Church of Jesus Christ of Latter-Day Saints. About a month afterward, 11 city employees resigned, at least one of whom said that his religion prevented him from "following a woman, and from serving on a board with apostates."

Education
Hildale is within the Washington County School District. Water Canyon School, a K-12 school, is in the city.

Around 1998, the city's elementary-age students attended the Phelps School in Hildale while many older students attended school in Colorado City Unified School District in Arizona.

In 2014 Washington County School District purchased the old Phelps Elementary Building and a building next to it. After a quick remodel, the old Phelps Elementary School was reopened as Water Canyon School. Two years later, the building next to Phelps was completed and opened as Water Canyon High School.

See also

 List of cities and towns in Utah

References

External links

 

Cities in Washington County, Utah
Fundamentalist Church of Jesus Christ of Latter-Day Saints
Latter Day Saint movement in Utah
Populated places established in 1963
1963 establishments in Utah
Cities in Utah